Kultura (Culture)—sometimes referred to as Kultura Paryska ("Paris-based Culture")—was a leading Polish-émigré literary-political magazine, published from 1947 to 2000 by Instytut Literacki (the Literary Institute), initially in Rome and then in Paris. 

It was edited and produced by Jerzy Giedroyc and ceased publication upon his death.

Giedroyc was one of the main reasons why Kultura enjoyed an unwavering prestige and a constant stream of esteemed contributors that enabled it to play a prominent role in Polish literary life. Kultura published polemics and articles, including those by Nobel Prize for Literature laureates Czesław Miłosz and Wisława Szymborska, as well as works by numerous other authors. Literary critics such as Maria Janion, Wojciech Karpiński, Jan Kott, and Ryszard Nycz also contributed. Kultura was and continues to be essential reading for students of Polish literature. Over the years it printed, and popularised the names of, many leading Polish writers and posts living under Communism and as anti-communist political refugees throughout the Polish diaspora, such as Gustaw Herling-Grudziński, Witold Gombrowicz, Marek Hłasko, Juliusz Mieroszewski, Józef Czapski, Konstanty Jeleński, and Bogdan Czaykowski.

Kultura also played a major role in Poland's reconciliation with Ukraine, Belarus and Lithuania, as the first independent Polish intellectual circle to openly advocate, in the 1950s, recognizing Poland's postwar eastern borders.  This involved renouncing Poland's claims to Lwów to a future independent Ukraine, and to Wilno to a future independent Lithuania. Kultura furthermore had a major role in Ukrainian literature publishing through the major work The Executed Renaissance, published by Ukrainian writer Yurii Lavrinenko with the support of Giedroyc. This book featured work by prominent Ukrainian writers and poets from the early period of Soviet Ukraine who were later arrested and executed in the 1930s. 

The concept of supporting the independence of Poland's eastern neighbors, elaborated by Juliusz Mieroszewski and known as ULB ("Ukraine, Lithuania, Belarus")—and inspired by Józef Piłsudski's Interbellum Prometheist policy—has had a major influence on Poland's foreign policies since 1989.

References

External links
 Paryska "Kultura" website, at Portal Onet
  Arts and Humanities, at www.intute.ac.uk 
 Paryska "Kultura" homepage 
A guide to the Konstanty Jeleński Papers at the Beinecke Rare Book and Manuscript Library
A guide to the Olga Scherer-Virski Papers at the Beinecke Rare Book and Manuscript Library
A guide to the Witold Gombrowicz Archive at the Beinecke Rare Book and Manuscript Library

1947 establishments in Italy
2000 disestablishments in France
Defunct literary magazines published in France
Magazines disestablished in 2000
Magazines established in 1947
Magazines published in Paris
Magazines published in Rome
Polish-language magazines